Luciana Barbosa de Oliveira Santos (born 29 December 1965) is a Brazilian engineer and politician. Santos has served as Minister of Science, Technology and Innovation in the cabinet of President Luiz Inácio Lula da Silva since 2023. She is the first woman to head the ministry. 

Santos has served as leader of the Communist Party of Brazil (PCdoB) since 2015. From 2019 to 2023, she served as vice governor of Pernambuco under PSB governor Paulo Câmara. Prior to this, she served as mayor of Olinda.

References 

1965 births
Living people
21st-century Brazilian women politicians
Communist Party of Brazil politicians
Leaders of political parties in Brazil
Members of the Chamber of Deputies (Brazil) from Pernambuco
Ministers of Science and Technology of Brazil
Women engineers
Women government ministers of Brazil